Duxbury is a town in Washington County, Vermont, United States. The population was 1,413 at the 2020 census. It claims to be the only municipality in the United States that has an elected position of dogcatcher.

History
In 1880, Emeline Meaker of Duxbury was hanged for poisoning her niece, Alice. The trial received much coverage throughout the country. She was the first woman hanged in Vermont.

Geography
According to the United States Census Bureau, the town has a total area of 43.1 square miles (111.6 km2), of which 42.9 square miles (111.2 km2) is land and 0.2 square mile (0.4 km2) (0.37%) is water.

Demographics

As of the census of 2000, there were 1,289 people, 498 households, and 338 families residing in the town.  The population density was 30.0 people per square mile (11.6/km2).  There were 569 housing units at an average density of 13.3 per square mile (5.1/km2).  The racial makeup of the town was 98.06% White, 0.16% African American, 0.16% Native American, 0.54% Asian, 0.23% from other races, and 0.85% from two or more races. Hispanic or Latino of any race were 0.54% of the population.

There were 498 households, out of which 32.9% had children under the age of 18 living with them, 59.2% were couples joined in either marriage or civil union, 4.8% had a female householder with no husband present, and 32.1% were non-families. 21.9% of all households were made up of individuals, and 6.2% had someone living alone who was 65 years of age or older.  The average household size was 2.52 and the average family size was 2.98.

In the town, the population was spread out, with 24.2% under the age of 18, 5.1% from 18 to 24, 34.8% from 25 to 44, 26.8% from 45 to 64, and 9.1% who were 65 years of age or older.  The median age was 38 years. For every 100 females, there were 109.6 males.  For every 100 females age 18 and over, there were 99.8 males.

The median income for a household in the town was $47,981, and the median income for a family was $57,574. Males had a median income of $34,125 versus $27,031 for females. The per capita income for the town was $20,707.  About 0.9% of families and 5.0% of the population were below the poverty line, including 1.3% of those under age 18 and 10.2% of those age 65 or over.

References

External links
 
 Town of Duxbury official website

 
Towns in Vermont
Towns in Washington County, Vermont